Shah Baharo Sindhi (شاهه بهارو) was a warrior, a military commander of Kalhora dynasty of Sindh, now a province of Pakistan, during the monarchy of Noor Mohammad Kalhoro and Mian Ghulam Shah Kalhoro. He also remained minister of Mian Noor Muhammad Kalhoro.  it is as well mentioned that he had been appointed as administrator by Mian Noor Muhammad Kalhoro. He fought 84 battles in his life time. He had dug many canals for irrigation purposes and also constructed forts. He died in 1188 H, 1735 AD and over his burial place the tomb was built by Mian Ghulam Shah Kalhoro in 1773/74 AD. The fresco paintings adorn the inner and outer walls of the tomb but now became dim. His tomb is located in Larkana city, Larkana District, Sindh, Pakistan.

References

History of Pakistan
History of Sindh
Kalhora dynasty